Hong Kong men's national softball team is the national team for Hong Kong. The team competed at the 1992 ISF Men's World Championship in Manila, Philippines where they finished with 1 win and 7 losses. The team competed at the 2004 ISF Men's World Championship in Christchurch, New Zealand where they finished fifteenth.

References

Men's national softball teams
softball
Men's sport in Hong Kong
Softball in Hong Kong